Mark Tedin is an artist whose work has appeared in collectible card games and role-playing games.

Early life and education
Mark Tedin was born in Sitka, Alaska. After high school, he attended college at Gonzaga University in Spokane, Washington, and then received his master's degree in fine arts at Washington University in St. Louis. He graduated in 1992.

Career
Tedin did freelance work for Wizards of the Coast and worked as a staff artist at Wizards of the Coast from 1997 - 2000. He is best known for his work on Magic: The Gathering and Dungeons & Dragons.

Tedin is one of the original twenty-five Magic: The Gathering artists. Outside of Magic he has worked on Vampire, Legend of the Five Rings, Legend of the Burning Sands, Battletech, Netrunner, and Doomtown.

Since his time at Wizards, Tedin has also worked part-time at the Northwest College of Art & Design near Seattle, where he has taught illustration, visual composition, and figure drawing.

References

External links
 Mark Tedin's website
 

Gonzaga University alumni
Living people
Role-playing game artists
Sam Fox School of Design & Visual Arts alumni
Year of birth missing (living people)